Naturism in Argentina (or nudism in Argentina) is the movement supporting the practice of social nudism in the country, which began to be regularly performed in 1934 and it is being practiced nowadays, despite still being a taboo topic in the Argentine society. The most important nudist destinations include Escondida Beach, Querandí Beach and Eden club in Buenos Aires Province, as well as Yatan Rumi in the Córdoba sierras.

History 
There is a precedent of nudism in Buenos Aires from the 1810s years, when the bathers went to the Buenos Aires city beaches and there bathed naked. This custom met opposition and was confronted by the authorities of that time with legal limits and fines, as well as trying to establish gender-segregated areas in the beaches with no much success.

The naturist movement per se was originated during the 1930s. Individuals like Francisco Verding, Agustín Puyo and Roberto Ferrer practiced nudism privately, but after they felt the wish to create a community to gather together naked, in 1934 they established in Castelar, Morón Partido, the First Naturist Nudist Association of Argentina (Primera Asociación Naturo Desnudista Argentina, or PANDA). When they performed nudity in public, soon the conservative parts of the society rejected these activities and the police interceded. Due to this situation, PANDA members —sometimes nicknamed as "adamites"— purchased a land on the shores of Reconquista river, 4 kilometers away from the old Márquez Bridge in Ituzaingó, being this the first truly naturist beach of Argentina. Then this association reached 90 members, 50 men and 40 women. They met together on Sundays to enjoy activities such as physical exercises, rhythmic dances, games, to watch the nature or to socialize, and at the end they bathed in the river. But at that time this led to having people lurking around the land to peek the naturist colony to see the naked people there. This association remained until the 1980s when it was broken up. In 1987 surfaced a new naturist community known as NAT by Cristian Vogt and Jorge Biagosh, in a country villa called "Los Galpones" near Benavídez city, Tigre Partido, Buenos Aires Province, which operated until March 1999.

On 10 January 1994, from an undertaking of actress Moria Casán and her then partner Luis Vadalá established Franka Beach (Playa Franka), an area in the coast of Argentina of Mar Chiquita Partido, Buenos Aires Province, where women could freely be topless. There was a demonstration of "brassiere cutting" to open the new summer season and as a symbolic representation to put an end to prejudices against self acceptance and to advocate for liberty, inclusion and gender equality. Later a parador or a beach facility was erected to serve the beach. But Franka Beach experience started to fell into crisis which, due to the pressure of some neighbours of the resort town to have it closed due to morality reasons but also mainly due to the debts from the shareholders Antonio Fraiese and Luis Vadalá after they failed to pay the beach license fee for eight years, on 3 September 2004 the intendant of Mar Chiquita cancelled the concession.

Nowadays the Association for the Argentine Naturist Nudism (Asociación para el Nudismo Naturista Argentino, or APANNA), a nonprofit organization congregate Argentine naturists and was established to promote naturism. It gained state authorization in September 2005.

Nudist locations 
Escondida Beach (Playa Escondida) is located in Chapadmalal, General Pueyrredón Partido, Buenos Aires Province, being the first beach of optional-clothing beach, established in 2001. People such as elderly, families and couples attend the beach, the latter comprising half of the visitors attending there.

Another naturist beach is Querandí Beach (Playa Querandí), optional-clothing, located in Villa Gesell Partido and designated as naturist beach by the local government in 2008.

In a country house of three hectares in La Reja town, Moreno Partido, Buenos Aires Province, lies the naturist club Edén, established in 1999. This club's activities include volleyball, trekking, singing and shared meals.

On the Sierra Grande, 14 kilometers away from Tanti city of Punilla Department, Córdoba Province, there is a naturist reservation known as Yatan Rumi, established in 2003. The people who attends here include families, couples without children and single men and women. In this destination a nudist marathon is held, and other activities are naked tango dancing, parties and other nature linked activities.

See also 

 Social nudity places in South America
 Naturism in Uruguay

References 

Argentina
Naturism